Unidentified is a 2020 Romanian thriller film directed by , starring , Dragos Dumitru, Ana Popescu, Kira Hagi and .

Cast
  as Florin Iespas
 Dragos Dumitru as Banel
  as Comisar Sef
 Ana Popescu as Stela Bercaru
 Kira Hagi as Simona Muntean
  as Mircea
 Emanuel Parvu as Marius Preda
  as Lizuca
 Ion Bechet as Dragos Chirila
 Ovidiu Crisan as Misu Macarie
 Vlad Dolanescu as Ovidiu Preda
 Cezar Antal as Batin
  as Dr. Ivan
 Mircea Florin Jr. as Nelu
 Ioana Bugarin as Cristina Tofan
 Ana Ularu as Dr. Natalia Marcu

Reception
Wendy Ide of Screen Daily called the film a "grimly efficient character study of a flawed and damaged man".

Michael Talbot-Haynes of Film Threat gave the film a score of 9/10 and called it a "superior portrait of the abyss that yawns beneath so many", and praised the direction, the performances and the screenplay.

Paul Petrache of Vice wrote a positive review of the film.

References

External links
 
 

Romanian thriller films
2020 thriller films